Puycasquier (Puicasquèr in Gascon) is a commune in the Gers department in southwestern France.

Geography

Localisation

Hydrography 
The river Auroue flows north-northwest through the western part of the commune.

Population

History
Home to the historic 'Gachet' family.

Puycasquier was home to a population of Cagots previously.

See also
Communes of the Gers department

References

Communes of Gers